Ali Ghorbani may refer to:

 Ali Ghorbani (footballer, born 1979), Iranian football midfielder who plays for Parseh Tehran
 Ali Ghorbani (footballer, born 1990), Azerbaijani and Iranian football striker who plays for Sumgayit